Rhododendron kanehirai is a species of plant in the family Ericaceae. It was originally endemic to Taiwan. It has become extinct in the wild, though it still exists in cultivated form.

References

kanehirai
Taxonomy articles created by Polbot
Plants described in 1921